Quizon Avenue is a Philippine sketch comedy show that aired on ABS-CBN. It starred Rodolfo "Dolphy" Quizon and his sons Enrico "Eric" Quizon, Jeffrey "Epi" Quizon and Vandolph Quizon. Also included were Kitkat, Ya Chang, Pokwang and Jenny Hernandez.

The show was first aired on ABS-CBN on March 5, 2005, and it became popular among oldies, and newers alike. Due to low ratings, the show aired the last episode with the 78th birthday celebration of Dolphy on July 22, 2006, replaced by John en Shirley.

Cast
Dolphy
Enrico "Eric" Quizon
Jeffrey "Epi" Quizon
Vandolph Quizon
Pokwang
Kitkat
Ya Chang
Jeni Hernandez

Guests
Homer Flores (as Brian Cayugyug, a parody of Ryan Cayabyab)
 Zsa Zsa Padilla
 Sandara Park
 Hero Angeles
 Joross Gamboa
 Roxanne Guinoo
 Eddie Garcia
 Maricel Soriano
 Sarah Geronimo
 Rachelle Ann Go
 Willie Nepomuceno

Notable scenes
 Ya Chang sings "Ako'y Isang Pinoy", but before he sings the second stanza, was caught by Bureau of Immigration officers.
 When Dolphy sings some songs like "si Aida, si Lorna o si Fe" or any song that has a woman's name, Zsa Zsa Padilla will confront him about women.
 When his sons cracks some punchlines, Dolphy applies slapstick by bashing them with rolled newspapers and empty plastic bottles.

Awards
Winner, Best Comedy Program - 2006 Catholic Mass Media Awards
Nominated, Best Gag Show - 20th PMPC Star Awards for Television 2006

External links
Telebisyon.net: Quizon Avenue

ABS-CBN original programming
Philippine television sitcoms
2005 Philippine television series debuts
2006 Philippine television series endings
Filipino-language television shows